See also Chennai BRTS, another planned bus transit system.

The Chennai Rapid Bus Transit Ways (RBTW) is a part of the Medium-term and Long-term Transport Scheme proposed in the Second Master Plan by the Chennai Metropolitan Development Authority (CMDA). This is not a part of Chennai BRTS, which is proposed on a separate elevated road that is to be constructed as circular corridors.

The Rapid Bus ways proposed along the following 7 routes, covering a distance of 100 km, would be taken up in the Medium-term Transportation Scheme

 Rajiv Gandhi Salai (OMR/IT Corridor) [20 km]
 Taramani Link Road [5 km]
 MBI Road [15 km]
 Pallavaram - Thoraipakkam Road [15 km]
 Sardar Patel Road [10 km]
 NSK Salai (Arcot Road) - KS Road [20 km]
 St. Thomas Mount - Poonamalle (Mount. Poonamalle Road) [15 km]

The following 8 routes will be covered in the Long-term Transportation Scheme

 Anna Salai [30 km]
 Poonamallee High Road [25 km]
 Jawaharlal Nehru Salai (IRR) [45 km]
 GNT Road [20 km]
 CTH Road [15 km]
 Chennai Bypass [20 km]
 Outer Ring Road (ORR) [62 km]
 CMBT - Sriperumbudur [25 km]

References

Urban transit in Chennai
Proposed bus rapid transit in India
Proposed infrastructure in Tamil Nadu